GNOME Screenshot is a desktop environment-agnostic utility for taking screenshots. It was part of the GNOME Utilities (gnome-utils) package, but was split into its own package for the 3.3.1 version in 2011. It was the default screenshot software in GNOME.

It provides several options, including capturing the whole desktop or just a single window, a time delay function, and some image effects. These options are also bound to keyboard shortcuts, PrtSc for whole screen, Crtl-PrtSc for current window, and Shift-PrtSc for area of the screen, which then automatically saves the screenshot to a file in the home directory.

Similar applications include Flameshot, Shutter which provides more options, and Spectacle in KDE.

See also 
Spectacle
scrot

References

External links 
 https://apps.gnome.org/app/org.gnome.Screenshot/
 the gnome-screenshot User's Guide

GNOME Applications
Graphics software that uses GTK
Free software programmed in C
Screenshot software